Dmitry Alexeyevich Machinsky (1937 – 8 January 2012) was a Russian archaeologist. He lived in Saint Petersburg and worked in the Hermitage Museum. Machinsky is particularly well known for having excavated Lyubsha and other Viking settlements along the Volkhov River. Machinsky attributed these settlements to the Rus' Khaganate, whose capital — as he believed — was Ladoga.

External links
Bibliography of Dmitry Machinsky
Machinsky vs. Shchukin

Archaeologists from Saint Petersburg
1937 births
2012 deaths